The Perl Foundation (TPF) is a non-profit, 501(c)(3) organization based in Holland, Michigan. It is dedicated to the advancement of the Perl and Raku (programming language) programming languages through open discussion, collaboration, design, and code. The Perl Foundation fulfills a range of activities which includes, "the collection and distribution of development grants, sponsorship and organization of community-led local and international Perl conferences, and support for community web sites and user groups."

Projects and activities
The Perl Foundation supports the use and development of Perl in many ways:
Supporting international YAPCs
Awarding grants for Perl projects
Network infrastructure operations, which support community websites such as PerlMonks.org, Perl Mongers, and perl.org
Holding copyrights for Perl 6
Annually Issuing the Perl White Camel award

Governance
The day-to-day business of TPF is run by several committees including the grants committee and conferences committee. These committees report to the TPF steering committee, which directs the operations of TPF. All of these groups are overseen by a board of directors. All TPF members, including the board of directors, are volunteers.

Notes

External links

Official website of Perl project

Foundation
Free software project foundations in the United States
Non-profit organizations based in Michigan
Science and technology in Michigan